The 1950 Canadian National Challenge Cup was won by Vancouver City.

Alberta
The Calgary Football Association reported the draw for the Dominion play downs.
10 June – Calgary Callies v. RCAF Flyers
14 June – Calgary Callies 2-1 Hillhurst 
17 June – Calgary Callies 5-0 Lethbridge Miners 
 Oliver St. Pats 4-2 Edmonton RCAF
 North Side Legion 3-2 Anavets
 North Side Legion 10-2 Oliver St. Pats 
home and home series with Edmonton must be completed by 15 July.  First game 1 July.
1 July Calgary Callies 5-0 Edmonton North Side Legion

Ontario–Quebec play-off

Montreal Hakoahs def. Toronto Mahers

Quebec

West End 2-1 Blue Bonnets (semi final at Charlevoix, 11 June 1950)

North End Hakoah v. Scottish (semi-final at Charlevoix, 13 June 1950)

Manitoba–Saskatchewan play-off
This series was played by the Regina Nationals and Winnipeg Scottish.

Saturday 29 July 5-1 at Taylor Field.

Monday 31 July 5-0

Manitoba–Western Ontario play-off
This best of 3 series leads to the National Championship and was hosted by Winnipeg.  Winner moves on to play the Regina Nationals to begin Saturday 29 July 1950.

Winnipeg Scottish v. Port Arthur Brent Park
Monday 24 July 1950 – 5-2 Winnipeg
Tuesday 25 July –
Wednesday 26 July – if necessary

Match list

Western final
The Western final was contested by Vancouver City and Calgary Callies in Calgary's Mewata Stadium.  The best of 3 series was swept 4-1 and 2-0.

Eastern final
The Eastern final, or Dominion semi-final, was contested by Winnipeg Scottish and Montreal Hakoahs in Winnipeg.

National final

References 

1950
Canadian Challenge Trophy
Challenge Trophy